Radiocarpal ligament can refer to:
 Dorsal radiocarpal ligament (ligamentum radiocarpale dorsale)
 Palmar radiocarpal ligament (ligamentum radiocarpale palmare)